Yazgünü is a village in the Kiğı District, Bingöl Province, Turkey. The village is populated by Kurds of the Lolan tribe and had a population of 73 in 2021.

The hamlet of Kalıntaş is attached to the village.

References 

Villages in Kiğı District
Kurdish settlements in Bingöl Province